Thomas Smith (born 6 June 2002) is an Australian racing driver who is currently competing in the 2023 FIA Formula 3 Championship with Van Amersfoort Racing. He previously raced with Douglas Motorsport in the GB3 Championship, having won one race & scoring two podium finishes.

Career

New Zealand Formula Ford
The first single-seater series in which Smith competed was the 2017–18 New Zealand Formula Ford Championship. He had a best finish of third place at Teretonga Park.

F3 Asian Championship

Smith's first year in the F3 Asian Championship was in 2019. Driving for Pinnacle Motorsport, Smith had a best finish of eighth place at the final race in Shanghai. This, along with five more points-scoring results, put him 12th in the championship. For the 2019–20 season, Smith joined Absolute Racing, teaming up with the inaugural W Series champion Jamie Chadwick and FIA F3 driver Devlin DeFrancesco. Smith ended the season in 10th place with 48 points, 218 points behind champion Joey Alders. His highest-scoring round came at the Chang International Circuit, where he placed sixth in Races 1 and 3 and ninth in Race 2.

Formula Renault Eurocup
In 2020, it was announced that Smith would race in Formula Renault Eurocup for the Italian team JD Motorsport alongside Finnish driver William Alatalo. However, due to the impact of COVID-19, Smith was not able to compete.

Formula Regional European Championship 
In 2021, Smith contested the newly formed Formula Regional European Championship with JD Motorsport alongside Eduardo Barrichello. Both Smith and Barrichello failed to amass points throughout the 20-race-long campaign, with the Australian ending up 31st in the standings. Of note, a multi-car incident on the first lap of Race 2 at Monaco resulted in Smith flipping the car of Nicola Marinangeli.

GB3 Championship

2021 
During the second half of 2021, Smith moved into the GB3 Championship, which he would contest with Douglas Motorsport. In the three rounds he contested, the Australian scored a best finish of twelfth, at Snetterton and Silverstone respectively, which meant a 22nd place in the drivers' standings.

2022 
He remained in the category for the 2022 season, once again driving for Douglas alongside Max Esterson and Marcos Flack. At the first round of the campaign, held at Oulton, Smith finished the main races in 17th place, whilst taking a second place in the reversed-grid Race 3, having defended against David Morales throughout the final laps. Following three rounds that yielded two top-five results in the reversed-grid races, Smith found himself finishing second again at Spa-Francorchamps, which, following the application of a red flag rule, which reinstated the results from the lap before the Race 3 had been abandoned, meant that the Australian was awarded with the victory. This would end up being the pinnacle of Smith's season, with him scoring only one top-ten finish in the final three events.

FIA Formula 3 
For 2023, Smith moved to the FIA Formula 3 Championship, driving for Van Amersfoort Racing.

Personal life 
Tommy is the grandson of Peter Smith, founder of the Specialized Container Transport (SCT) Group. His father, Geoff Smith, is Peter's eldest son and currently the Managing Director of SCT Logistics.

Smith's uncle Jack Smith is also a racing driver. He is currently competing in the Supercars Championship with Brad Jones Racing.

Racing record

Racing career summary

* Season still in progress.

Complete Australian Formula 4 Championship results 
(key) (Races in bold indicate pole position) (Races in italics indicate fastest lap)

Complete Toyota Racing Series results 
(key) (Races in bold indicate pole position) (Races in italics indicate fastest lap)

Complete F3 Asian Championship results 
(key) (Races in bold indicate pole position) (Races in italics indicate fastest lap)

Complete S5000 results

Complete Formula Regional European Championship results 
(key) (Races in bold indicate pole position) (Races in italics indicate fastest lap)

Complete GB3 Championship results 
(key) (Races in bold indicate pole position) (Races in italics indicate fastest lap)

Complete FIA Formula 3 Championship results 
(key) (Races in bold indicate pole position) (Races in italics indicate fastest lap)

* Season still in progress.

References

External links
 

2002 births
Living people
People educated at Brighton Grammar School
Australian racing drivers
F3 Asian Championship drivers
Toyota Racing Series drivers
BRDC British Formula 3 Championship drivers
Formula Regional European Championship drivers
JD Motorsport drivers
Pinnacle Motorsport drivers
Racing drivers from Melbourne
FIA Formula 3 Championship drivers
Van Amersfoort Racing drivers
Australian F4 Championship drivers